Spanakorizo ("spinach rice") is a Greek vegetarian dish of spinach and rice. A pilaf, it is described as a typical Greek country dish that may be eaten hot or cold.

A typical recipe includes long-grain rice and fresh spinach along with dill, cumin, salt, black pepper, red wine vinegar, onion, and olive oil, often topped with a fried egg and served with feta cheese and lemon. Wine pairings that have been suggested are simple white wines such as Tsantali Agiorgitiko, Boutari Lac des Roches, or retsina.

References

Greek cuisine
Greek stews
Rice dishes
Spinach dishes
Vegetarian cuisine